Klaus Düwel (10 December 1935 – 31 December 2020) was a German philologist who specialized in Germanic studies. A professor at the University of Göttingen, he was recognized as one of the world's leading experts on Germanic Antiquity.

Biography
Klaus Düwel was born in Hannover on 10 December 1935. Since 1956 he studied history and the German language at the University of Göttingen with the aim of becoming a teacher. Düwel transferred to the University of Tübingen in 1958, and to the University of Vienna in 1969. At Vienna, Düwel was strongly influenced by philologist Otto Höfler, who introduced him to the field of Germanic studies. He also studied Protestant theology.

Düwel received his Ph.D. in 1965 under the supervision of Lange. With Lange, Düwel worked on the third revision of Rudolf Much's commentary on Germania. He completed his habilitation in 1972 with a thesis on Germanic religion. The preparation for his habilitation was funded with a grant from the Deutsche Forschungsgemeinschaft, which enabled him to conduct research in Scandinavia.

Following his habilitation, Düwel returned to the University of Göttingen, where he was appointed a professor in 1974. From 1978 to 2001, Düwel was a professor at the Seminator for German Philology at the University of Göttingen.

Düwel's research centered on Germanic Antiquity, particularly runology and the study of early Germanic literature. He was recognized as one of the world's leading authorities in this discipline. Düwel contributed a large number of articles to the second edition of Reallexikon der Germanischen Altertumskunde.

Düwel was a member of the Royal Gustavus Adolphus Academy, the Royal Norwegian Society of Sciences and Letters, the Norwegian Academy of Science and Letters, and a corresponding member of the Austrian Academy of Sciences. On 5 May 2014 he received the Cross of the Order of Merit of the Federal Republic of Germany.

Selected works
 Werkbezeichnung der mittelhochdeutschen Erzähliteratur (1050-1250), 1965
 Runenkunde, 1983
 Werkbezeichnungen der mittelhochdeutschen Erzählliteratur (1050 - 1250), 1983
 (Editor) Der Reinhart Fuchs des Elsässers Heinrich / Heinrich [der Glîchezâre] 1985
 (Co-editor) Untersuchungen zu Handel und Verkehr der vor- und frühgeschichtlichen Zeit in Mittel- und Nordeuropa, 1985-1989
 Das Opferfest von Lade: quellenkritische Untersuchungen zur germanischen Religionsgeschichte, 1985
 (Editor) Runische Schriftkultur in kontinental-skandinavischer und -angelsächsischer Wechselbeziehung, 1994
 Schmuck und Waffen mit Inschriften aus dem ersten Jahrtausend, 1995
 (Editor) Runeninschriften als Quellen interdisziplinärer Forschung, 1998
 (Co-editor) Von Thorsberg nach Schleswig, 2001
 (With Rudolf Simek and John S. McKinnel) Runes, magic and religion, 2004
 Runica minora, 2015

See also
 Wilhelm Heizmann
 Heinrich Beck (philologist)
 Rudolf Simek
 Robert Nedoma
 Kurt Schier
 François-Xavier Dillmann

Sources

 
 Ebenda: Schriftenverzeichnis Klaus Düwel'' (1964–2002), S. 1008–1024.
 
 

1935 births

2020 deaths
Corresponding Members of the Austrian Academy of Sciences
German male non-fiction writers
German philologists
Germanic studies scholars
Germanists
Members of the Norwegian Academy of Science and Letters
Members of the Royal Gustavus Adolphus Academy
Recipients of the Cross of the Order of Merit of the Federal Republic of Germany
Old Norse studies scholars
People from Hanover
Royal Norwegian Society of Sciences and Letters
Runologists
University of Göttingen alumni
Academic staff of the University of Göttingen
Writers on Germanic paganism